QT8 is a station on Line 1 of the Milan Metro in Milan, Italy. The underground station was opened on 8 November 1975 as a one-station extension from Lotto. On 12 April 1980, the line was extended to San Leonardo. It is located at Piazza Santa Maria Nascente, in the QT8 district.

References

Line 1 (Milan Metro) stations
Railway stations opened in 1975
1975 establishments in Italy
Railway stations in Italy opened in the 20th century